Calvin Roberts (April 25, 1927 – March 3, 1966) was an American football offensive tackle/defensive tackle. He played college football for Gustavus Adolphus College. He was elected to the College Football Hall of Fame in 2003.

1927 births
People from Renville County, Minnesota
American football offensive tackles
American football defensive tackles
Gustavus Adolphus College alumni
College Football Hall of Fame inductees
1966 deaths